Sportfive is an international sports marketing agency operating globally with offices around the world. The headquarters of Sportfive is based in Hamburg, Germany.

History
Sportfive was formed in 2001, when the European Commission unconditionally approved the merger between the sports rights activities of Jean-Claude Darmon, Sport+, a subsidiary of Canal+ Group, and RTL Group's sports rights division, UFA Sports.

In 2004, the private equity firm Advent International finalized its acquisition of Sportfive S.A., and in November 2006 sold it to the French media giant Lagardère for an estimated €865 million.

In 2015, Sportfive was integrated into Lagardère Sports and Entertainment, as Lagardère Sports S.A.S. Thereafter, the Sportfive Group business in Germany, Sportfive GmbH, became Lagardère Sports Germany GmbH, and the UK business became Lagardère Sports UK.

In May 2020, the agency was rebranded back to Sportfive following its takeover by H.I.G. Europe, an arm of the international private equity and asset management firm H.I.G. Capital. The revived name and new corporate identity was unveiled and became effective immediately across all regional operations and for most subsidiary companies. H.I.G. acquired a 75.1% stake in the business in April 2020, and the remaining shares in July 2021.

The rebrand follows the restructuring of the global leadership team at the agency. The four-person executive committee includes chief executive Stefan Felsing, the experienced sports marketing executive who has returned to the agency, chief operating officer Philipp Hasenbein, the long-time head of Lagardère Sports Germany, plus Robert Müller von Vultejus, another Lagardère Sports veteran who takes up the newly-created position of chief growth officer.

Business
Sportfive is one of leading football agencies and one of the largest sports agencies worldwide. The agency also has a reputation in esports. The agency has a wide variety of services but predominantly Sportfive is active in consulting, partnership sales and marketing as well as sponsorship activation. 
In recent years, Sportfive has optimized and fine-tuned its comprehensive marketing concept for football clubs. The concept includes recruiting a suitable shirt sponsor, marketing and advertising panels in the stadium, organizing of hospitality events, marketing TV and Internet rights, and developing marketing concepts and realizing them in a professional manner with a team based at the club. Currently Sportfive International Sàrl is the official sales agent of Match Hospitality in the territory of Continental Europe for the sale of the Official Hospitality Programme for the 2010 FIFA World Cup South Africa.

In February 2009, the International Olympic Committee appointed Sportfive as its official media rights agent for the 2014 Winter Olympics in Sochi, Russia, and the 2016 Summer Olympics in Rio de Janeiro, Brazil across all distribution platforms, in 40 European markets. In addition to its leading role in the field of football marketing, Sportfive is also involved in many other international professional sports arenas such as handball, basketball, triathlon, tennis and motor sports.

Sportfive has cooperations in place with more than 30 football associations and over 250 clubs, as well as ten leagues. In Germany, Sportfive already represents ten Bundesliga clubs (among others: Hamburger SV, Hertha BSC Berlin, Karlsruher SC and Borussia Dortmund). Leading clubs from other European football leagues have also chosen to sign with Sportfive, including Olympique Lyon, Paris St. Germain, AJ Auxerre and AS Monaco from the French Ligue 1, Atalanta Bergamo, U.C. Sampdoria and Juventus F.C. from Italy’s Serie A and PAOK FC Superleague Greece.

In August 2012, Sportfive organized the friendly game between Dinamo Bucharest and FC Barcelona at the Arena Națională, Bucharest, Romania.

In Germany, the company was instrumental in brokering the naming rights for the HSH Nordbank Arena in Hamburg, the Commerzbank Arena in Frankfurt, the Signa Iduna Park in Dortmund and others.

Sportfive also offers a wide range of consulting services and regularly publishes comprehensive market and media studies, feasibility studies and up-to-date market research reports.

In May 2022, Sportfive announced the acquisition of brand-focused marketing specialists Wolfe Solutions. As part of the acquisition, Wolfe Solutions will be rebranded under the Sportfive banner and see its team integrated into the organization, in addition to SportFive expanding its footprint in the US by retaining Wolfe Solutions' Columbia and South Carolina offices.

Sportfive Italia
Sportfive Italy S.r.l. is part of the international Sportfive Group and cooperates with the Serie A teams Juventus F.C., Atalanta B.C. and U.C. Sampdoria. For these clubs, Sportfive Italy is the concessionaire of certain marketing and commercial rights. As part of a long-term strategic partnership with Juventus, Sportfive Italy exclusively sells the naming right and markets other promotional and sponsorship rights for the new stadium in Turin. Since 2001, the agency has been implementing its comprehensive marketing model for Atalanta B.C. This comprehensive marketing model developed by Sportfive integrates different sponsorship and hospitality tools into an interlinked marketing network and has been successfully applied to numerous clubs across Europe. For U.C. Sampdoria, Sportfive Italy manages specific aspects of the commercial and marketing rights. The newly established Italian unit for Stadium Development draws on the Sportfive Group’s expertise in this field and manages new stadium construction and modernization projects in all phases.

References

External links
 International Homepage
 Official German Website 
 Official French Website 

Companies based in Hamburg
Companies based in Paris
Pan-European media companies
Sports marketing
Sports companies